Pouched rats are a group of African rodents in the subfamily Cricetomyinae. They are members of the family Nesomyidae, which contains other African muroids such as climbing mice, Malagasy mice, and the white-tailed rat. All nesomyids are in the superfamily Muroidea, a large and complex clade containing  of all mammal species. Sometimes the pouched rats are placed in the family Muridae along with all other members of the superfamily Muroidea.

Pouched rats are found throughout much of sub-Saharan Africa with the exception of southern Africa. They are characterized by having large cheek pouches and a distinctive molar morphology. The molars are very similar to the type seen in the subfamily Murinae, but pouched rats probably evolved this similarity through convergent evolution.

There are three very different genera of pouched rats. The giant pouched rat is notable for being the largest of the muroids. A giant pouched rat was also implicated as a carrier in a small outbreak of monkeypox in the US. The three genera of Cricetomyinaeds contain eight species.

Classification
Subfamily Cricetomyinae - pouched rats
Genus Beamys
Lesser hamster-rat, Beamys hindei
Greater hamster-rat, Beamys major
Genus Cricetomys - giant pouched rats
Southern giant pouched rat, Cricetomys ansorgei
Gambian pouched rat, Cricetomys gambianus
Emin's pouched rat, Cricetomys emini
Kivu giant pouched rat, Cricetomys kivuensis
Genus Saccostomus - pouched mice
South African pouched mouse, Saccostomus campestris
Mearns's pouched mouse, ''Saccostomus mearnsi

Sources
 

 

 

Nesomyid rodents